Golgi reassembly-stacking protein of 65 kDa (GRASP65) also known as Golgi reassembly-stacking protein 1 (GORASP1) is a protein that in humans is encoded by the GORASP1 gene.

Function 

The Golgi complex plays a key role in the sorting and modification of proteins exported from the endoplasmic reticulum. The GRASP65 protein is a peripheral membrane protein anchored to the lipid bilayer through myristoylation of a glycine residue near the protein's amino terminus. It is involved in establishing the stacked structure of the Golgi apparatus and linking the stacks into larger ribbons in vertebrate cells. It is a caspase-3 substrate, and cleavage of this encoded protein contributes to Golgi fragmentation in apoptosis. GRASP65 can form a complex with the Golgi matrix protein GM130, and this complex binds to the vesicle docking protein p115. Several alternatively spliced transcript variants of this gene have been identified, but their full-length natures have not been determined.

Structure 

GRASP65 contains two PDZ domains in the amino-terminal GRASP domain (amino acid residues 2–210), that comprises approximately half of the protein. The GRASP region interacts with the Golgi matrix protein GM130 as well as an  intrinsically disordered region in the C-terminus.

Interactions 

GORASP1 has been shown to interact with TGF alpha, TMED2 and GOLGA2.

Notes

References

Further reading

External links 
 Molecular models of GRASP65/GM130/P115-mediated cis-cisternae membrane stacking and vesicle tethering.